The Destiny of Me is a play by Larry Kramer. The play follows Ned Weeks, a character from Kramer's play The Normal Heart. The play premiered Off-Broadway in 1992, and was a finalist for the Pulitzer Prize for Drama.

Overview
It focuses on Ned Weeks, a character introduced in The Normal Heart, as he checks into the National Institutes of Health to undergo an experimental treatment for AIDS. Much of his story is told in flashback, as Ned recalls growing up as Alexander in a Jewish household where, as a hardcore theatre aficionado, he imitates Cornelia Otis Skinner and Mary Martin and adorns his bedroom with Broadway posters. He constantly is beaten by his father Richard, a government employee who never fulfilled the promise of his Yale education, for being "different" and a "sissy," while his sympathetic but complacent mother Rena fails to intervene. Meanwhile, both parents dote on his brother Benjamin, who grows up to become a successful attorney with a dazzling career.

Productions
The play premiered Off-Broadway, produced by the Circle Repertory Company, at the Lucille Lortel Theatre on October 11, 1992 and closed on March 21, 1993 after 198 performances. Directed by Marshall W. Mason, the cast included John Cameron Mitchell as  Alexander, Jonathan Hadary as Ned, David Spielberg as Richard, Piper Laurie as Rena, and Peter Frechette as Benjamin.

Larry Kramer was nominated for the 1993 Pulitzer Prize for Drama.
 Kramer won the Obie Award and the 1993 Lucille Lortel Award for Outstanding Play, and John Cameron Mitchell won the Obie Award, Performance.

Critical response
Frank Rich of the New York Times observed, "No one can accuse Mr. Kramer of being a boy who cried wolf. History may judge this impossible, reflexively contentious man a patriot. But what makes The Destiny of Me so fascinating, and at times overwhelmingly powerful, is not so much its expected single-mindedness about AIDS as its unexpectedly relentless pursuit of the crusader at center stage. Mr. Kramer cannot solve the medical mystery of the virus or the psychological mystery of the world's tardy response to the peril. What he can try to crack is his own mystery: Why was he of all people destined to scream bloody murder with the aim of altering the destiny of the human race? The writing in The Destiny of Me can fall short of Mr. Kramer's ambitions, but it is never less than scaldingly honest." He continued, "Not by happenstance is The Destiny of Me a juicy, three-act memory play in the mode of that Arthur Miller-Tennessee Williams era, with occasional flashes of humor reminiscent of latter-day variations on the form by Neil Simon and Herb Gardner . . . Given the conventionality of Mr. Kramer's dramatic format, one sometimes wishes the dialogue fleshing it out were finer. He has a good ear, but it is the ear of a journalist, not a poet."

Film adaptation
In December 2014, After the success of the film adaptation of The Normal Heart, it was reported that Kramer was set to write an adaptation The Destiny of Me for HBO, with Ryan Murphy returning to direct the film, and Mark Ruffalo, Julia Roberts and Jim Parsons mentioned as potentially reprising their roles.

References

External links
 

1992 plays
Off-Broadway plays
Plays by Larry Kramer
LGBT-related plays
HIV/AIDS in theatre